Meadows Embankment is a tram stop on the Nottingham Express Transit (NET) network. The stop is situated in the Meadows area of the city of Nottingham just to the north of the Wilford Toll Bridge across the River Trent. It is situated on reserved track and comprises a pair of side platforms flanking the tracks. The stop is on line 2 of the NET, from Phoenix Park via the city centre to Clifton, and trams run at frequencies that vary between 4 and 8 trams per hour, depending on the day and time of day.

Meadows Embankment opened on 25 August 2015, along with the rest of NET's phase two.

The stop is situated near the junction of Queens Walk and Victoria Embankment, and in the original plans for NET phase two, the stop was known as Queens Walk tram stop. However, by popular demand this name was transferred to the next stop north on Queens Walk, nearer the Queens Walk Park and Community Centre, and the current name adopted as a synthesis of The Meadows and Victoria Embankment.

References

External links

Nottingham Express Transit stops
Railway stations in Great Britain opened in 2015